Litchfield is a town in Kennebec County, Maine, United States. The population was 3,586 at the 2020 census. Litchfield is included in the Augusta, Maine micropolitan New England City and Town Area.

Litchfield was incorporated in 1795 and was originally known as Smithfield Plantation.  It is found in the 1790 census as Smithtown Plantation, Lincoln County, Maine.

Geography

Demographics

2010 census

As of the census of 2010, there were 3,624 people, 1,441 households, and 1,036 families living in the town. The racial makeup of the town was 97.0% White, 0.8% African American, 0.3% Native American, 0.2% Asian, 0.1% from other races, and 1.4% from two or more races. Hispanic or Latino of any race were 0.9% of the population.

There were 1,441 households, of which 30.4% had children under the age of 18 living with them, 56.9% were married couples living together, 9.3% had a female householder with no husband present, 5.7% had a male householder with no wife present, and 28.1% were non-families. 20.3% of all households were made up of individuals, and 6.3% had someone living alone who was 65 years of age or older. The average household size was 2.50 and the average family size was 2.85.

The median age in the town was 43 years. 21.5% of residents were under the age of 18; 7.2% were between the ages of 18 and 24; 24.1% were from 25 to 44; 34.8% were from 45 to 64; and 12.4% were 65 years of age or older. The gender makeup of the town was 49.2% male and 50.8% female.

2000 census

As of the census of 2000, there were 3,110 people, 1,190 households, and 897 families living in the town. The racial makeup of the town was 98.36% White, 0.06% African American, 0.26% Native American, 0.42% Asian, 0.16% from other races, and 0.74% from two or more races. Hispanic or Latino of any race were 0.80% of tradition the population.

There were 1,190 households, out of which 35.0% had children under the age of 18 living with them, 60.5% were married couples living together, 8.4% had a female householder with no husband present, and 24.6% were non-families. 18.1% of all households were made up of individuals, and 5.6% had someone living alone who was 65 years of age or older.  The average household size was 2.61 and the average family size was 2.93.

In the town, the population was spread out, with 26.3% under the age of 18, 5.6% from 18 to 24, 31.6% from 25 to 44, 26.4% from 45 to 64, and 10.1% who were 65 years of age or older.  The median age was 38 years. For every 100 females, there were 99.2 males.  For every 100 females age 18 and over, there were 99.3 males.

The median income for a household in the town was $41,096, and the median income for a family was $42,220. Males had a median income of $33,000 versus $25,225 for females. The per capita income for the town was $17,835.  About 5.7% of families and 8.1% of the population were below the poverty line, including 8.2% of those under age 18 and 5.5% of those age 65 or over.

Education

Litchfield has consolidated its school system and along with Sabbatus and Wales is part of Regional School Unit (RSU) #4. Libby Tozier and Sabattus Primary schools serve Grades Pre-K–2. Carrie Ricker School serves Grades 3–5. Oak Hill Middle School serves Grades 6–8. Oak Hill High School serves Grades 9–12 and is located in Wales.

Public safety

Litchfield runs a volunteer Fire Dept. Litchfield Fire Dept. runs 2 stations, and 7 fire apparatus. They also have first responders for Medical emergencies which run 1 non-transporting ambulance. All medical emergency transports are done through Gardiner Fire Dept. Police protection is provided by Kennebec County Sheriff's Office and Maine state Police.

Litchfield Fair 
The Litchfield Agricultural Society, now the Litchfield Farmer's Club, formed in 1857 and held the first Litchfield Fair in 1858. The annual fair is held at the fairgrounds on Plains Road. The fair is always held the weekend after Labor Day. Its motto is "What a Fair Should Be." The fair features agricultural demonstrations, an exhibition hall, a museum, an antique car parade, a demolition derby, carnival rides, games, food and vendors.

Notable people

 David C. Burr, state legislator (1820–1827)
 Avery Yale Kamila, journalist and community organizer
 Ormandel Smith, state legislator, Maine State Treasurer and Secretary of State of Maine
 John Day Smith, Minnesota state legislator and judge
 Andrew Tozier, Civil War Medal of Honor Recipient (born in Monmouth)
 James Franklin Ware, Wisconsin state legislator

References

External links
 Official website
 Historical Society of Litchfield, Maine
 Litchfield Fair

Towns in Kennebec County, Maine
Towns in Maine